Hellinsia inulae is a moth of the family Pterophoridae. It is found on the Canary Islands, Iberian Peninsula, Corsica, Sardinia, Sicily, Cyprus and in Germany, Austria, Italy, the Czech Republic, Poland, Slovakia, Hungary, Croatia, Romania, Bulgaria, Bosnia and Herzegovina, North Macedonia, Greece, Russia, North Africa and Asia Minor.

The larvae feed on Inula britannica, Inula salicina, Inula viscosa and Dittrichia viscosa.

References

inulae
Moths described in 1852
Plume moths of Africa
Plume moths of Asia
Plume moths of Europe
Taxa named by Philipp Christoph Zeller